In computer programming, explicit parallelism is the representation
of concurrent computations by means of  primitives
in the form of special-purpose directives or function calls. Most parallel primitives are related to process synchronization, communication or task partitioning. As they seldom contribute to actually carry out the 
intended computation of the program, their computational cost is often considered
as parallelization overhead.

The advantage of explicit parallel programming is the absolute programmer
control over the parallel execution. A skilled
parallel programmer takes advantage of explicit parallelism to produce
very efficient code.  However, programming with explicit parallelism is often difficult, especially for 
non computing specialists, because of the extra work involved in planning
the task division and synchronization of concurrent processes.  

In some instances, explicit parallelism may be avoided with the use of  an optimizing compiler that automatically extracts the parallelism inherent to computations (see implicit parallelism).

Programming with explicit parallelism
Occam (programming language)
Erlang (programming language)
Message Passing Interface
Parallel Virtual Machine
Ease programming language
Ada programming language
Java programming language
JavaSpaces

Computer programming